Phú Thủy may refer to:

Phú Thủy, Bình Thuận, a ward of Phan Thiết
Phú Thủy, Quảng Bình, a rural commune of Lệ Thủy District